Democratic Gathering can refer to:

Democratic Gathering (Lebanon) - a political alliance in Lebanon led by the Progressive Socialist Party
National Democratic Gathering - a banned opposition alliance in Syria
Independent Democratic Gathering - a political party in Iraq that contested the December 2005 elections as part of the Iraqi National List coalition